Alexander Polyakov (born January 31, 1969, Vishnovoye, Tambov Oblast) is a Russian political figure and a deputy of the 8th State Duma. 

In 1995, Polyakov engaged in business. From 1998 to 2001, he worked as an economist. In 2001-2003, Polyakov was the director of the Tambovbreadmacaronproduct. In February 2009, he joined the United Russia. In 2016, he was elected deputy of the 7th State Duma. In 2021, Polyakov was re-elected for the 8th State Duma from the Tambov Oblast constituency.

References

1969 births
Living people
United Russia politicians
21st-century Russian politicians
Eighth convocation members of the State Duma (Russian Federation)